Ashley Michael Dodd (born 7 January 1982) is an English former professional footballer who played as a midfielder. He played in 16 games for Port Vale in the Football League in the 2000–01 and 2001–02 seasons. A former Manchester United youngster, he later played for non-league sides Moor Green, Stafford Rangers, Hednesford Town and Gresley Rovers.

Career
Dodd started his career with Premier League club Manchester United, but in March 2001 he was loaned out to Port Vale in the Second Division. After impressing at Vale the move was made permanent two months later. Signing a one-year contract in May 2001, he scored one goal in 13 games, appearing fairly regularly in the first half of the 2001–02 season. However, he did not play a game in the 2002 end of the season and was released in April 2002. He went from Moor Green to Stafford Rangers in August 2002 and signed for Hednesford Town in 2003. He made his full debut for the "Pitmen" on 9 September 2003, in a 1–1 draw away at Grantham Town. He ended the 2003–04 season with 16 starts and eight substitute appearances. He moved to Gresley Rovers in 2004, but left the club in May 2005 after scoring six times in 53 appearances. In June 2009 he joined St Peter, who play in the Channel Islands.

Career statistics
Source:

References

1982 births
Living people
Sportspeople from Stafford
English footballers
Association football midfielders
Manchester United F.C. players
Port Vale F.C. players
Moor Green F.C. players
Stafford Rangers F.C. players
Hednesford Town F.C. players
Gresley F.C. players
English Football League players
Southern Football League players
National League (English football) players
Northern Premier League players